University of Putra Malaysia (Malay: Universiti Putra Malaysia), abbreviated as UPM, is a Malaysian public research university located in Serdang, Selangor. Formerly it was named Universiti Pertanian Malaysia (Agricultural University of Malaysia), focusing on agricultural sciences and related fields. Since the 1990s, the fields of study have expanded to include human ecology, languages, architecture, medicine, computer science and biotechnology. Currently there are 15 faculties, 11 institutes and 2 schools covering these as well as agriculture, forestry, veterinary medicine, economics, engineering, sciences, and education.

UPM has been recognised as a research university since 2006, one of five present in Malaysia. In 2010, self-accreditation status was awarded by Malaysian Qualifications Agency to simplify the procedure of accrediting academic programs, strengthening its own Internal Quality Assurance (IQA) system to compete among local universities.

It is ranked 123rd in the world in 2023 by Quacquarelli Symonds, 27th among Asian universities and the 2nd best university in Malaysia. In the Integrated Rating of Malaysian Institutions of Higher Education (SETARA), UPM maintains its six stars rating, which is "Highly Competitive".

History 

On 21 May 1931, UPM was established as School of Agriculture, located on Serdang with 22 acres (9 hectares) of land. The only two programmes offered were a three-year diploma programme and a one-year certificate course in agriculture. On 23 June 1947, the school was upgraded to the College of Agriculture Malaya, as declared by the then Governor of Malayan Union, Sir Edward Gent.

On 29 October 1971, Universiti Pertanian Malaysia (literally Agricultural University of Malaysia) was officially established through the merger of College of Agriculture Malaya and the Faculty of Agriculture, University of Malaya. UPM began with three faculties in the fields of agriculture, forestry and veterinary medicine. On 23 July 1973, UPM had its first academic session with intake of 1,559 students. On 30 July 1977, UPM held the first convocation ceremony, which also declared the appointment of UPM's first Chancellor, Sultan Salahuddin Abdul Aziz Shah.

On 3 April 1997, UPM changed its name to Universiti Putra Malaysia, declared by Dr. Mahathir Mohamad, the then Prime Minister of Malaysia. The reason for changing name was to indicate UPM's diversification of the fields of study it offered, especially in Science and Technology. The word "Putra" is taken from Tunku Abdul Rahman Putra Al-Haj, the first Prime Minister of Malaysia. One of the reasons the word "Putra" was chosen is because the location of UPM near to Putrajaya. To correspond with the new name, UPM changed the logo as well.

List of chancellors and vice-chancellors

Campus 

Aside from the main campus in Serdang, UPM has a branch campus in Bintulu, Sarawak. In June 1987, the National Resources Training Centre relocated to Bintulu from its provisional campus in Kuching. On 27 August 1987, the campus in Bintulu became a branch campus of UPM, abbreviated as UPMKB. Currently the Bintulu campus consists of 2 faculties, the Faculty of Agricultural and Forestry Sciences and the Faculty of Humanities, Management and Science, as well as one institute, the Institute of Ecosystem Science Borneo. The campus offers undergraduate and postgraduate programmes, with approximately 1600 students in total.

UPM used to have another branch campus in Mengabang Telipot, Kuala Terengganu from 1996 until the establishment of Terengganu University College in 1999. Originally, it was the Centre for Fisheries and Marine Science under UPM. In June 1996, the UPM's Faculty of Fisheries and Marine Science was transferred to Kuala Terengganu it was made into a branch campus of UPM. Starting from 5 May 1999, it was named Terengganu University College and became an associate campus of UPM. In 2001, it was given autonomy and renamed again as Malaysian Science and Technology University College. It has been upgraded to university status in 2007, as the Universiti Malaysia Terengganu.

Academic profile 
UPM began its academic life in 1973 with three founding Faculties and a Division of Basic Sciences. The first intake of 1,559 students was for bachelor's degrees in Agricultural Science or Forestry Science, Doctor of Veterinary Medicine, Diploma in Home Technology, Diploma in Animal Health and Production, Diploma in Science with Education, and Preliminary Programme. As of 2021, UPM has 15 faculties, 11 institutes and 2 schools, offers 8 diploma programmes, 80 bachelor programmes, 66 Masters programmes by coursework and more than 300 fields of study in Master and Doctoral programmes by research. The Doctor of Medicine program provided by the Medical and Health Science division of the university was fully recognised by the Malaysia Medical Council on 5 June 2001. The School of Business and Economics (previously Faculty of Economics and Management) has received AACSB and EQUIS accreditation in 2012 and 2022 respectively.

Faculties, schools and institutes 
As of December 2022, UPM has 15 faculties, 11 institutes and 2 schools.

Campus life

Residential colleges 
The accommodation units in UPM are called "colleges", however, the colleges are not related to education, but built to provide accommodation for students, known as "residential college" or kolej kediaman. Before the UPM's Governance Transformation Plan, there were 17 residential colleges in Serdang campus and one in Bintulu campus. The residential colleges in Serdang campus can be divided into four zone, which are lembah, pinggiran, bukit and serumpun.

The Tenth College (K10) and the Tan Sri Mustaffa Babjee College (KMB) are two colleges at zon pinggiran because they are distant from other colleges, located at northeast and southwest of UPM respectively. K10 accommodate the students from Faculty of Engineering and Faculty of Design and Architecture while KMB accommodates the students from Faculty of Veterinary Medicine and Faculty of Medicine and Health Sciences.

The Twelfth College (K12) and Fourteenth College (K14) are located at zon serumpun and known as "Serumpun Colleges". They are built by PJS Development, a private construction company through the form of BOT. However, the Mohamad Rashid College (KMR) is temporarily relocated to the Block P1 and Block P2 of Serumpun since 2019. After the relocation of KMR, its original site is transformed into KMR OnePUTRA Residence that managed by UPM Holdings.

The Sri Rajang College (KSR) is the only residential college in Bintulu campus, consists of 10 blocks that could accommodate up to 1,560 students.

The Governance Transformation Plan in 2019 has restructured the residential colleges in Serdang campus. Most of them have been merged with another college to save costs and improve administrative efficiency. As of 2022, the list of residential colleges is as follow:

Libraries 
UPM has one main library and three branch libraries in Serdang campus, and one library in Bintulu campus.

The Sultan Abdul Samad Library (Malay: Perpustakaan Sultan Abdul Samad, abbreviation: PSAS) is the main library of UPM. It existed before the establishment of UPM in 1971. The library was renamed the Sultan Abdul Samad Library and inaugurated on 23 May 2002, named after Sultan Abdul Samad, the fourth Sultan of Selangor. PSAS consists of block A and B (completed in 1982 and 1969 respectively), with total floor area of 19,007 square metres.

Another three branch libraries in Serdang are Medicine and Health Sciences Library (1998), Veterinary Medicine Library (1999), and Engineering and Architecture Library (2008). The library in Bintulu start operating when the campus was reopened in 2001.

Main hall 

The Sultan Salahuddin Abdul Aziz Shah Arts and Cultural Centre (Malay: Pusat Kebudayaan dan Kesenian Sultan Salahuddin Abdul Aziz Shah, abbreviation: PKKSSAAS) is the main hall in Serdang campus. It was completed in 1978 and known as the Great Hall of UPM (Dewan Besar UPM) before its name was changed. On 25 April 1996, the hall was inaugurated by Sultan Salahuddin Abdul Aziz Shah, the eighth Sultan of Selangor. Since then, UPM renamed the Great Hall to its current name. PKKSSAAS is the venue for orientation, convocation, and even examinations.

The Experimental Theatre (Panggung Percubaan) is part of PKKSSAAS. It is a place for workshops on culture and arts, suitable for theatre performances and debate competition. It can also be used as a platform for the trial of performances.

Mosque 
The UPM Mosque (Malay: Masjid UPM) is the university mosque that built to fulfill the prayer needs of Muslim community from UPM and Taman Sri Serdang. The construction started in 1987 and completed in 1989, with total area of 9 hectares. The exterior design of the mosque is inspired by Saladin's war helmet, symbolising the spirit of Jihad in Islam. The mosque consists of 2 floors, able to congregate 9,500 people at the same time. The University Islamic Centre, founded on 1 October 1988, is responsible for managing the mosque and Islamic affairs of UPM.

Expo Hill 

The Expo Hill (Malay: Bukit Ekspo) is a recreational place in UPM, located at south of Thirteenth College and northwest of UniPutra Golf Club. With the area approximately 12 hectares, it has divided into five zones. Another 13 hectares is made up of 5 freshwater fish ponds which are rearing 5 different fish species (Lampam, Tilapia, Rohu, Belida and Sepat). The Expo Hill was used as the venue of the Agricultural Expo and Convocation Festival for the first time during the first convocation of UPM in 1977. There is an elevated railway track crossing the Expo Hill, travelled by KLIA Ekspres and KLIA Transit, to which the nearest station is Bandar Tasik Selatan station.

Transportation accessibility 
In Serdang campus, UPM buses travel around the campus to bring students to their destination (e.g. residential colleges or academic zone).

The  Serdang KTM station is currently the nearest railway station, 15 minutes driving distance from UPM. Although e-hailing is available in campus, students can getting there either by UPM bus or by  Smart Selangor bus. The Putrajaya Line will start to operate completely in March 2023, the UPM students will be able to walk (or take a feeder bus) to  UPM MRT station, located at northwest edge of UPM.

Rankings 

The graphs below show the QS Rankings and THE Rankings respectively. The rankings by region (Asia) are not same as the Asian universities' ranking filtered from world rankings because QS changed the indicators and weightings; THE also recalibrated their results to reflect priorities and attributes of Asian universities. In the 2021 rankings, QS Top 50 Under 50 and THE Young University Ranking ranked UPM for the last time because 50 years had passed since it was established as a university in 1971.

THE Impact rankings 
Times Higher Education Impact Rankings are the global performance tables that assess universities against the United Nations' Sustainable Development Goals (SDGs).

UI GreenMetric 
In 2022, Universiti Putra Malaysia is ranked 25th in the world. The ranking of UI GreenMetric is based on:
 Setting & infrastructure (SI)
 Energy & climate change (EC)
 Waste (WS)
 Water (WR)
 Transportation (TR)
 Education & research (ED)
The ranking also placed UPM second in Asia, and maintains first position within the country for 13 consecutive years since the ranking was introduced in 2010.

Notable alumni

Politicians 
 Dato' Seri Dr. Ahmad Zahid Hamidi, Deputy Prime Minister of Malaysia
 Datuk Seri Saifuddin Nasution Ismail, Minister of Home Affairs
 Datuk Seri Haji Salahuddin Ayub, Minister of Domestic Trade and Living Costs
 Chang Lih Kang, Minister of Science and Technology
 Dato' Seri Amirudin Shari, Menteri Besar of Selangor
 Datuk Seri Ronald Kiandee, former Minister of Agriculture and Food Industries
 Dato' Sri Hajah Rohani Abdul Karim, former Minister of Women, Family and Community Development
 Datuk Seri Dr Mujahid Yusof Rawa, former Minister in the Prime Minister's Department (Religious Affairs)
 Datuk Seri Wilfred Madius Tangau, former Deputy Chief Minister of Sabah
 Chong Eng, member of the Penang State Legislative Assembly for Padang Lalang
 Najwan Halimi, member of the Selangor State Assembly for Kota Anggerik

Athletes 
 Cheah Liek Hou, badminton player
 Leong Mun Yee, diver
 Cheong Jun Hoong, diver
 Roslinda Samsu, pole vaulter
 Bibiana Ng, shooter
 Johnathan Wong, shooter
 Nazmizan Muhammad, sprinter
 Zaidatul Husniah Zulkifli, sprinter
 Azreen Nabila Alias, athlete
 Welson Sim, swimmer
 Hakimi Ismail, triple jumper
 Sharul Aimy, artistic gymnast
 Diana Bong Siong Lin, wushu athlete

Academics 
 Ali Dehghantanha, Professor, University of Guelph
 Faiza Darkhani, environmentalist, women's rights activist, and educator
 Moi Meng Ling, Professor, the University of Tokyo, virologist

Poets 
 Raja Rajeswari Setha Raman, poet

Businesspeople 
 Ebit Lew, founder of Elewsmart
 Dato' Seri Ibrahim Ahmad, founder of Brahim's
 Wen Shin Chia, founder of cooking oil recycling company Green Yards

See also 
 Universiti Putra Malaysia Bintulu Campus
 List of universities in Malaysia

Notes

References

External links

Universiti Putra Malaysia

University of Putra Malaysia
Educational institutions established in 1931
Agricultural universities and colleges in Malaysia
Veterinary schools in Malaysia
Business schools in Malaysia
Engineering universities and colleges in Malaysia
Design schools in Malaysia
Medical schools in Malaysia
Nursing schools in Malaysia
Information technology schools in Malaysia
ASEAN University Network